Zsombor Piros (born 13 October 1999) is a Hungarian tennis player.

Piros has a career-high ATP singles ranking of world No. 138, achieved on 10 October 2022. He also has a career-high ATP doubles ranking of world No. 991, achieved on 8 August 2022. He is currently the No. 3 Hungarian player.

Junior career
On the junior tour Piros had a career-high ranking of 3 achieved on 4 September 2017. Piros won the 2017 Australian Open boys' singles championships, defeating Israeli Yshai Oliel in the final.

He made headlines at Wimbledon 2017 when he and doubles partner Yibing Wu fell foul of Wimbledon's pants police, and were required to change their underpants from black to white to comply with regulations. Even without their lucky pants they won the subsequent match 6–4 6–1.

Piros won the Hungarian Tennis Championships on 1 October 2017.

Professional career

2018: First Challenger win, first Top 100 win
Piros began his year at the Nouméa Challenger, where he came through qualifying to reach the 2nd round, losing to eventual champion Noah Rubin. In the 1st round, he defeated the top seed, Julien Benneteau of France, in three sets, 3–6, 7–5, 6–1, to record his first Challenger win as well as his first win against a Top 100 player. Next, he entered the Australian Open singles qualifying, falling to Bjorn Fratangelo of the United States in the 2nd round.

2021: First Challenger final and top 300 debut
He reached his maiden Challenger final at the 2021 Slovak Open II as a qualifier  and moved 58 positions up in the rankings to a new career-high ranking of No. 282 on 15 November 2021.

2022: Maiden Challenger title, Top 150 debut
He made his top 200 debut on 25 April 2022 at World No. 189 in the singles rankings following his second Challenger final at the 2022 Split Open in Croatia.

Following his maiden Challenger title at the 2022 Tampere Open he reached the top 150 at world No. 139 in the rankings on 25 July 2022.

He won his second title at the 2022 Gwangju Open Challenger defeating Emilio Gómez (tennis). As a result he reached a new career-high singles ranking of No. 138 on 10 October 2022.

National representation
Piros has represented Hungary at Davis Cup, where he has a win–loss record of 6–5, including a five-set victory over top 100 player Jiri Vesely.

Junior Grand Slam finals

Singles: 1 (1 title)

Doubles: 1 (1 title)

ATP Challenger and ITF Futures finals

Singles: 12 (7-5)

Record against other players

Piros's match record against players who have been ranked in the top 100, with those who are active in boldface. 
ATP Tour, Challenger and Future tournaments' main draw and qualifying matches are considered.

Davis Cup

Participations: (6–5)

   indicates the outcome of the Davis Cup match followed by the score, date, place of event, the zonal classification and its phase, and the court surface.

References

External links
 
 
 

1999 births
Living people
Hungarian male tennis players
Australian Open (tennis) junior champions
French Open junior champions
Tennis players from Budapest
Grand Slam (tennis) champions in boys' singles
Grand Slam (tennis) champions in boys' doubles
20th-century Hungarian people
21st-century Hungarian people